Henry M. Hardenbergh was a veteran of the American Civil War and a recipient of the Medal of Honor.

Biography
Hardenbergh was born in Noble County, Indiana. He later moved to Tinley Park, Illinois and worked at a store. Little else is known about Hardenbergh's early life.

Hardenbergh joined the Union army on August 15, 1861. He was tasked with manning the requa, a primitive type of rapid fire artillery. In 1862, he fought against soldiers under the command of Confederate General "Stonewall" Jackson during Jackson's Valley Campaign. In 1863, he participated in the Siege of Charleston. In January 1864, Hardenbergh's enlistment ended, although he reenlisted following a brief furlough home.

Second Battle of Deep Bottom
On August 16, 1864, Hardenbergh and the 39th Illinois Veteran Volunteer Infantry took part in a 200-yard charge on Confederate fortifications in Henrico County, Virginia. Hardenbergh, who was carrying his regiments colors, but continued advancing after passing the flag onto another soldier. After breaching the Confederate fortifications, Hardenberg engaged in hand-to-hand combat with the color bearer of the 10th Alabama Infantry. He was left severely injured, but he successfully captured the flag.

Following the battle, Hardenbergh presented the captured flag to Union General David B. Birney. Birney recommended Hardenbergh for the Medal of Honor and a lieutenant's commission in the 36th U.S. Colored Troops.

Citation

Death
Hardenbergh was killed by a Confederate sniper on August 28, 1864, while on picket duty during the Siege of Petersburg. He never received his officer's commission, and his Medal of Honor was awarded posthumously. He now rests at Poplar Grove Cemetery near Petersburg, Virginia.

Legacy
On August 16, 1995, a marker was erected by Bremen Township near Richmond, Virginia, near where Hardenbergh fought during the Second Battle of Deep Bottom. The marker was placed to commemorate Hardenbergh.

See also
Jackson's Valley Campaign
Second Battle of Deep Bottom
Siege of Petersburg

Notes

References

External links

1840s births
1865 deaths
American Civil War recipients of the Medal of Honor
Burials in Virginia
People of Indiana in the American Civil War
People from Noble County, Indiana
Union Army soldiers
United States Army Medal of Honor recipients
Union military personnel killed in the American Civil War